{{Infobox person
| name        = Jeannetta Arnette
| image       =   
| alma_mater  = George Washington University
| education   = North Carolina School of the Arts
| occupation  = Actress 
| known_for   = Head of the ClassBoys Don't CryLadybugs| birth_date  =  
| birth_place = Washington, D.C., U.S.
| yearsactive = 1977-present
}}

Jeannetta Arnette is an American actress. She became known for her television role as Miss Meara on the situation comedy Head of the Class. She has also appeared in numerous films, including 1992's Ladybugs and 1999's Boys Don't Cry, and guest-starring roles on television. 

Arnette grew up in North Carolina and attended high school at North Carolina School of the Arts, studied acting in England and attended college at George Washington University where she began acting in local theatrical productions. She dropped out of college to move to Los Angeles to pursue an acting career there.

In 2006, she co-starred in Tori Spelling's VH1 sitcom, So NoTORIous and played Sarah Jean, an innocent death-row inmate, on CBS' Criminal Minds.  In 2014, she played in a recurring role in the CBS series, Extant''.

Filmography

Film

Television

References

External links
 
 
 

Living people
American film actresses
American television actresses
Actresses from North Carolina
20th-century American actresses
21st-century American actresses
Year of birth missing (living people)